Barbara Lewe-Pohlmann-Schüttpelz (born 9 September 1956 in Emsdetten, North Rhine-Westphalia) is a West German sprint canoer who won competed from the late 1970s to the early 1980s. Competing in two Summer Olympics, she won two medals at Los Angeles in 1984 with a silver in the K-1 500 m and a bronze in the K-2 500 m events.

References
databaseOlympics.com
Sports-reference.com profile

1956 births
Living people
People from Emsdetten
Sportspeople from Münster (region)
Canoeists at the 1976 Summer Olympics
Canoeists at the 1984 Summer Olympics
West German female canoeists
Olympic canoeists of West Germany
Olympic bronze medalists for West Germany
Olympic silver medalists for West Germany
Olympic medalists in canoeing
Medalists at the 1984 Summer Olympics